The 16th Critics' Choice Awards were presented on January 14, 2011 at the Hollywood Palladium, honoring the finest achievements of 2010 filmmaking. The ceremony was broadcast on VH1. The nominees were announced on December 13, 2010.

Winners and nominees

Best Picture Made for Television
The Pacific 
 Temple Grandin
 You Don't Know Jack

Joel Siegel Award
Matt Damon

Music+Film Award
Quentin Tarantino

Statistics

References

External links
 16th Annual Critics' Choice Movie Awards (2011) // Best Picture: The Social Network at Critics Choice Association

Broadcast Film Critics Association Awards
2010 film awards